The following is a list of songs by the American Indie pop band The Narrative that have recorded one studio album, three extended plays and one b-side album. The band first got together after Suzie Zeldin answered a Craigslist ad put up by Jesse Gabriel in 2006.

They soon found out that they were studying in the same school on Bellmore, Long Island, but never met. So after the answer of Suzie, they discovered they shared the same passion for music. The two collaborated on music, first forming the short-lived project January Window spending the next couple of years (2006–2007) in Suzie's cramped Upper West Side apartment crafting songs for their first EP. And officially formed The Narrative on 2008 releasing the debut EP Just Say Yes.

In 2010 they released the debut album The Narrative. Charles Seich joined the group on 2008 and in 2010 became a band member, until 2011 when he left. The band release their b-side album, B-Sides and Seasides in 2012 to promote the recording of a second full-length. On June 3, 2014 the band released their single "Chasing a Feeling". Their second studio album ´Golden Silence will be released December 2, 2016.

Songs

References

External links
 

Narrative, The
List